This is a list of species in the agaric genus Tricholoma. , Index Fungorum lists 379 species in the genus.


A B C D E F G H I J K L M N O P Q R S T U V U W X Y Z

A 

Tricholoma abietinum Velen. 1920 – Europe
Tricholoma acerbum (Bull.) Quél. 1872
Tricholoma acicularum Velen. 1947
Tricholoma acutistramineum Corner 1994 – Singapore
Tricholoma aeruginascens Corner 1994
Tricholoma aestivum Velen. 1920 – Europe
Tricholoma aestuans (Fr.) Gillet 1874
Tricholoma albatum Velen. 1920 – Europe
Tricholoma albidulum N.Ayala, G.Moreno & Esteve-Rav. 1997
Tricholoma albidum Bon 1984
Tricholoma albobrunneum (Pers.) P.Kumm. 1871
Tricholoma alboconicum (J.E.Lange) Clémençon 1983
Tricholoma alboluteum Velen. 1920 – Europe
Tricholoma albosquamulatum Beeli 1927
 Tricholoma album (Schaeff.) P.Kumm. 1871
Tricholoma altaicum Singer 1943
Tricholoma amplum (Pers.) Rea 1922
Tricholoma anatolicum H.H. Doğan & Intini, 2015
Tricholoma andinum E. Horak 1964
Tricholoma apium Jul. Schäff. 1925
Tricholoma argenteum Ovrebo 1989
Tricholoma argyraceum (Bull.) Gillet 1874
Tricholoma argyropotamicum Speg. 1899
Tricholoma arvernense Bon 1976 – Europe
Tricholoma atro-olivaceum Rick 1939
Tricholoma atrodiscum Ovrebo 1989
Tricholoma atroscriptum Corner 1994
 Tricholoma atrosquamosum Sacc. 1887
Tricholoma atroviolaceum A.H.Sm. 1944 – North America
Tricholoma aurantiipes Hongo 1991
Tricholoma aurantio-olivaceum A.H.Sm. 1944 – North America
Tricholoma aurantium (Schaeff.) Ricken 1914
Tricholoma austrocolossum Grgur. 2002
Tricholoma azalearum (Murrill) Murrill 1942

B 

Tricholoma bakamatsutake Hongo 1974
Tricholoma baldratianum Sacc. 1916
Tricholoma bambusarum Corner 1994
Tricholoma basirubens (Bon) A.Riva & Bon 1988
Tricholoma batschii Gulden 1969
Tricholoma betilonganum Corner 1994
Tricholoma bezdeki Velen. 1920 – Europe
Tricholoma bisontinum Rolland 1902
Tricholoma bonii Basso & Candusso 1997
Tricholoma boreosulphurescens Mort. Chr. & Heilm.-Claus., 2017
Tricholoma borgsjoeënse Jacobsson & Muskos 2006 – Fennoscandia
Tricholoma borneomurinum Corner 1994
Tricholoma bresadolanum Clémençon 1977
Tricholoma brunneicirrus Corner 1994
Tricholoma brunneosquamosa Beeli 1927
Tricholoma bryogenum Mort. Chr., Heilm.-Claus. & Vauras, 2017
Tricholoma bubalinum (G.Stev.) E.Horak 1971
Tricholoma bufonium (Pers.) Gillet 1874
Tricholoma bulliardii Velen. 1939 – Europe
Tricholoma busuense Corner 1994
Tricholoma buzae Dennis 1970

C 

 Tricholoma caligatum (Viv.) Ricken 1914
Tricholoma carbonicum Velen. 1920 – Europe
Tricholoma carneoflavidum (Kalchbr.) McAlpine 1895
Tricholoma cartilagineum (Bull.) Quél. 1872
Tricholoma catulus E.H.L.Krause 1928
Tricholoma cavipes Corner 1994
Tricholoma cedretorum (Bon) A.Riva 2000
Tricholoma cedrorum Maire 1914
Tricholoma ceriniceps Pegler 1983
Tricholoma cheilolaminum Ovrebo & Tylutki 1975
Tricholoma chrysophyllum A.Riva, C.E.Hermos. & Jul.Sánchez 1998
Tricholoma cifuentesii Courtec. 1985
Tricholoma cingulatum (Almfelt ex Fr.) Jacobashch 1890
Tricholoma cinnamomeum (Murrill) Murrill 1914
Tricholoma clavipes Riedl 1976
Tricholoma clavocystis Musumeci & Contu 2008 – Europe
Tricholoma coffeaceum Velen. 1920 – Europe
Tricholoma collybiiformis Velen. 1920 – Europe
Tricholoma colossus (Fr.) Quél. 1872
 Tricholoma columbetta (Fr.) P.Kumm. 1871
Tricholoma concolor (Delile ex De Seynes) P.-A.Moreau, Bellanger & Courtec. 2011
Tricholoma confragipes Iwade 1944
Tricholoma cookeanum Bertault & Malençon 1975
Tricholoma cordae Velen. 1920 – Europe
Tricholoma cortinatellum Singer 1954
Tricholoma cortinatum Singer 1952
Tricholoma crenulatum Horniček 1977
Tricholoma crepidotoides Corner 1994
Tricholoma crucigerum (St.-Amans) Sacc. & Trotter 191
Tricholoma cuneifoloides (Fr.) P.Kumm. 1871
Tricholoma cutifractum Corner 1994
Tricholoma cyclophilum (Lasch) Sacc. & Trotter 1912
Tricholoma czuicum (Singer) Singer, 1951

D 
Tricholoma dermolomoides Corner 1994
Tricholoma diabolicum Rick 1926
Tricholoma diemii Singer 1954
Tricholoma distantifoliaceum E.Ludw. & H.Willer 2012
Tricholoma distinguendum S.Lundell 1942
Tricholoma dulciolens Kytöv. 1989
Tricholoma duriusculum R.Schulz 1927
Tricholoma durum Velen. 1939 – Europe

E 
Tricholoma edentulum Velen. 1920 – Europe
Tricholoma elegans G.Stev. 1964 – New Zealand
Tricholoma elvirae Singer 1969
Tricholoma eosinobasis Babos, Bohus & Vasas 1991
Tricholoma equestre (L.) P.Kumm. 1871
Tricholoma evenosum (Sacc.) Rea 1932
Tricholoma ezcarayense C.E.Hermos. & Jul.Sánchez 1994

F 

Tricholoma fagineum Velen. 1925
Tricholoma fagnani Singer 1952
Tricholoma farinolens E.Horak 1964
Tricholoma ferrugineimelleum Corner 1994
Tricholoma fiherensis L.M.Dufour & H.Poiss. 1927
Tricholoma filamentosum (Alessio) Alessio 1988
Tricholoma fissilifolium Corner 1994
Tricholoma flammulaecolor Beeli 1927
Tricholoma flavifolium Velen. 1920 – Europe
Tricholoma focale (Fr.) Ricken 1914
Tricholoma foliicola Har.Takah. 2001
Tricholoma forteflavescens Reschke, Popa, Zhu L. Yang & G. Kost, 2018
Tricholoma fracticum (Britzelm.) Kreisel 1984
Tricholoma fractipes Velen. 1920 – Europe
Tricholoma frondosae Kalamees & Shchukin 2001
Tricholoma fuegianum Courtec. 1985
Tricholoma fuliginea Beeli 1927
Tricholoma fulvimarginatum Ovrebo & Halling 1986
Tricholoma fulvocastaneum Hongo 1960
Tricholoma fulvum (DC.) Bigeard & H.Guill. 1909
Tricholoma fumidellum (Peck) Sacc. 1887
Tricholoma furcatifolium Corner 1994
Tricholoma fuscinanum Corner 1994
Tricholoma fusipes E.Horak 1964
Tricholoma fusisporum Singer 1943

G 

Tricholoma gallaecicum (Blanco-Dios) Blanco-Dios, 2009
Tricholoma gausapatum (Fr.) Quél. 1872
Tricholoma glareosum Velen. 1927
Tricholoma glatfelteri (Murrill) Murrill 1914
Tricholoma goliath (Fr.) S.Lundell & Nannf. 1942
Tricholoma goossensiae Beeli 1933
Tricholoma graminicola Velen. 1920 – Europe
Tricholoma grande Peck 1891
Tricholoma granulosum Lebedeva 1949
Tricholoma griseipileatum Corner 1994
Tricholoma griseoviolaceum Shanks 1996 – United States
Tricholoma groanense Viola 1959
Tricholoma grossulariodorum E.Horak 1964
Tricholoma guldeniae Mort.Chr. 2009

H 
Tricholoma hathorae Velen. 1939 – Europe
Tricholoma hebeloma (Peck) Sacc. 1887
Tricholoma hebelomoides E.Horak 1964
Tricholoma hemisulphureum (Kühner) A. Riva ex Boffelli, 2016
Tricholoma henningsii Sacc. & Trotter 1912
Tricholoma hirtellum Peck 1907
Tricholoma holici Velen. 1920 – Europe
Tricholoma horakii Raithelh. 1972
Tricholoma hortorum Velen. 1925
Tricholoma humosum (Quél.) S.Imai 1938
Tricholoma huronense A.H. Sm., 1942
Tricholoma hygrophanum Velen. 1939 – Europe

I 

Tricholoma ilkkae Mort. Chr., Heilm.-Claus., Ryman & N. Bergius, 2017
Tricholoma imbricatum (Fr.) P.Kumm. 1871
Tricholoma impudicum Velen. 1947
Tricholoma inamoenum (Fr.) Gillet 1874
Tricholoma inocyboides Corner 1994
Tricholoma insigne Ovrebo 1989
Tricholoma intermedium Peck 1888
Tricholoma iputingaense Bat. & A.F.Vital 1958

J 
Tricholoma jalapense (Murrill) Sacc. & Trotter 1925
Tricholoma jamaicensis (Murrill) Sacc. & Trotter 1925
Tricholoma joachimii Bon & A.Riva 1985
Tricholoma josserandii Bon 1975

K 
Tricholoma khakicolor Corner 1994

L 
Tricholoma laricicola Velen. 1939 – Europe
Tricholoma lascivum (Fr.) Gillet 1874
Tricholoma latifolium Speg. 1898
Tricholoma lavendulophyllum F.Q.Yu 2006
Tricholoma leoninum Velen. 1939 – Europe
Tricholoma leucophyllum Ovrebo & Tylutki 1975
Tricholoma leucoterreum Mariotto & Turetta 1996
Tricholoma lilacinocinereum Métrod ex Bon 1990
Tricholoma lobatum Velen. 1939 – Europe
Tricholoma losii Kavina 1926
Tricholoma luridum (Schaeff.) P.Kumm. 1871
Tricholoma luteomaculosum A.H. Sm., 1942

M 

Tricholoma maculatipus Hongo 1962
Tricholoma magellanicum (Speg.) Sacc. 1891
 Tricholoma magnivelare (Peck) Redhead 1984
Tricholoma manzanitae T.J.Baroni & Ovrebo 1983
Tricholoma marasmiforme Velen. 1939 – Europe
Tricholoma margarita (Murrill) Murrill 1940
Tricholoma marquettense Ovrebo 1986
 Tricholoma matsutake (S.Ito & S.Imai) Singer 1943
Tricholoma mauritianum Peerally & Sutra 1973
Tricholoma megaphyllum Boud. 1910
Tricholoma melleum Reschke, Popa, Zhu L. Yang & G. Kost, 2018
Tricholoma mensula Corner 1994
Tricholoma meridianum A.Pearson 1950
Tricholoma mesoamericanum Justo & Cifuentes, 2017
Tricholoma michiganense A.H. Sm., 1942
Tricholoma microcarpoides Corner 1994
Tricholoma minutissimum Corner 1994
Tricholoma minutum Corner 1994
Tricholoma mnichovicense Velen. 1947
Tricholoma montis-fraseri Corner 1994
Tricholoma moseri Singer 1989
Tricholoma moserianum Bon 1990
Tricholoma mostnyae Singer 1969
Tricholoma multifolium (Murrill) Murrill 1914
Tricholoma multipunctum (Peck) Sacc. 1887
Tricholoma muricatum Shanks 1996 – United States
 Tricholoma murrillianum Singer 1942 – North America
Tricholoma muscarioides Reschke, Popa, Zhu L. Yang & G. Kost, 2018
 Tricholoma muscarium Kawam. ex Hongo 1959
Tricholoma muscorum Velen. 1947
Tricholoma mutabile Shanks 1996 – United States

N 
Tricholoma naranjanum Dennis 1951
Tricholoma nigripes Velen. 1920 – Europe
Tricholoma nigrum Shanks & Ovrebo 1996 – North America
Tricholoma nobile Peck 1889

O 

Tricholoma oblongisporum Bissett 1992
Tricholoma obscurum Velen. 1920 – Europe
Tricholoma ochraceorobustum E.Horak 1964
Tricholoma odorimutabile Corner 1994
Tricholoma olens Velen. 1939 – Europe
Tricholoma olgae Velen. 1920 – Europe
Tricholoma olidum Velen. 1920 – Europe
Tricholoma olivaceobrunneum Ovrebo 1986
Tricholoma olivaceoflavum (Murrill) Sacc. & Trotter 1925
Tricholoma olivaceoluteolum Reschke, Popa, Zhu L. Yang & G. Kost, 2018
Tricholoma olivaceotinctum Heilm.-Claus. & Mort. Chr. 2009
Tricholoma olivaceum Reschke, Popa, Zhu L. Yang & G. Kost, 2018
Tricholoma oliveum Farl. & Burt, 1929
Tricholoma opiparum (Fr.) Bigeard & H. Guill. 1909
 Tricholoma orirubens Quél. 1872
Tricholoma orlosii Pilát 1950

P 

Tricholoma palustre A.H.Sm. 1942
Tricholoma pampeanum Speg. 1898
Tricholoma panicolor Corner 1994
Tricholoma pannonicum Bohus, 1960
Tricholoma pardalotum Herink & Kotl. 1967
 Tricholoma pardinum (Pers.) Quél. 1873
Tricholoma parvisporum Corner 1994
Tricholoma pascuum Velen. 1939 – Europe
Tricholoma patagonicum Singer 1954
Tricholoma penangense Corner 1994
Tricholoma permelleum Corner 1994
Tricholoma persicinum (Fr.) Quél. 1872
Tricholoma pessundatum (Fr.) Quél. 1872
Tricholoma phoeniceum (Sacc.) Singer 1943
Tricholoma piceum Velen. 1947
Tricholoma pilatii Velen. 1925
Tricholoma plagiotum (Kalchbr.) McAlpine 1895
Tricholoma populinum J.E.Lange 1933
Tricholoma porta-dalveyi Corner 1994
 Tricholoma portentosum (Fr.) Quél. 1873
Tricholoma praetervisum Velen. 1939 – Europe
Tricholoma pratense Pegler & R.W.Rayner 1969
Tricholoma preslii Velen. 1920 – Europe
Tricholoma primulibrunneum Corner 1994
Tricholoma psammopus (Kalchbr.) Quél. 1875
Tricholoma pseudoargyraceum Velen. 1925
Tricholoma pseudoimbricatum J.E.Lange & Terk. 1944
Tricholoma pseudolimacium Velen. 1920 – Europe
Tricholoma pseudonictitans Bon 1983
Tricholoma pseudoputidum Velen. 1939 – Europe
Tricholoma pseudorussula (Speg.) Sacc. 1891
Tricholoma pseudosaponaceum Hásek 1959
Tricholoma pullum Ovrebo 1989
Tricholoma pulverulentipes (Murrill) Sacc. & Trotter 1925
Tricholoma purpureiflavum Corner 1994
Tricholoma pusillisporum Speg. 1922
Tricholoma pygmaeum Velen. 1920 – Europe

Q 
Tricholoma quercetorum Contu 2004
Tricholoma quercicola (Murrill) Murrill 1949

R 
 
Tricholoma radicans Hongo 1968 – Japan
Tricholoma radotinense Peck 1903
Tricholoma ramentaceum (Bull.) Ricken 1915
Tricholoma rauli Garrido 1988
Tricholoma rhizophoreti Corner 1994
Tricholoma rigidovelatum Raithelh. 1991
Tricholoma rimosoides Dennis 1951
Tricholoma robiniae Velen. 1925
Tricholoma robustum (Alb. & Schwein.) Ricken 1915
Tricholoma romagnesii Singer 1943
Tricholoma roseoacerbum A.Riva 1984 – Europe, North America
Tricholoma rostratum Velen. 1920 – Europe
Tricholoma rubescens Velen. 1920 – Europe
Tricholoma rufenum P.Donati 1994
Tricholoma rufulum R.Heim 1934
Tricholoma rugulicinctum Corner 1994

S 

Tricholoma sanguinescens Velen. 1925
 Tricholoma saponaceum (Fr.) P.Kumm. 1871
Tricholoma scabrum L.M.Dufour 1913
Tricholoma scalpturatum (Fr.) Quél. 1872
Tricholoma schustleri Velen. 1920 – Europe
Tricholoma sciodes (Pers.) C.Martín 1919
Tricholoma sejunctum (Sowerby) Quél. 1872
Tricholoma sericeum Rick 1920
Tricholoma sienna (Peck) Sacc. 1887
Tricholoma silvaticum Peck 1889
Tricholoma singaporense Corner 1994
Tricholoma sinoacerbum T.H. Li, Hosen & Ting Li, 2015
Tricholoma sinopardinum Zhu L. Yang, X.X. Ding, G. Kost & Rexer, 2017
Tricholoma sinoportentosum Zhu L. Yang, Reschke, Popa & G. Kost, 2018
Tricholoma smithii Ovrebo & K.W. Hughes, 2018
Tricholoma solitarium (Alessio) Contu 2009
Tricholoma sparsifolium Velen. 1925
Tricholoma sphagnicola Hruby 1930
Tricholoma spongiosum Petch 1917
Tricholoma stanekii Pilát 1953
Tricholoma stans (Fr.) Sacc. 1887
Tricholoma stiparophyllum (N.Lund) P.Karst. 1879
Tricholoma stipitirufescens Corner 1994
Tricholoma striatifolium (Peck) Sacc. 1887
Tricholoma striatum (Schaeff.) Quél. 1872
Tricholoma subamarum Herp. 1912
Tricholoma subannulatum (Peck) Zeller 1922
Tricholoma subargillaceum (Murrill) Sacc. & Trotter 1925
Tricholoma subaureum Ovrebo 1986
Tricholoma subcinerascens Rick 1939
Tricholoma subcinereiforme (Murrill) Sacc. & Trotter 1925
Tricholoma subclytocybe Velen. 1925
Tricholoma subcuneifolium Corner 1994
Tricholoma subfuscum Velen. 1920 – Europe
Tricholoma subglobisporum Bon 1976 – Europe
Tricholoma subimbricatum Velen. 1920 – Europe
Tricholoma sublatum Murrill 1942
Tricholoma subluteum Peck, 1904
Tricholoma subniveum Velen. 1925
Tricholoma subresplendens (Murrill) Murrill, 1914
Tricholoma subsulphureum (Britzelm.) Sacc. & Traverso 1911
Tricholoma subumbrinum A.H.Sm. 1944 – North America
Tricholoma sudum (Fr.) Quél. 1873
Tricholoma sulcatum Velen. 1920 – Europe
Tricholoma sulphurellum Rick 1919
Tricholoma sulphurescens Bres. 1905
 Tricholoma sulphureum (Bull.) P.Kumm. 1871

T 

Tricholoma tanzanianum Pegler 1977
Tricholoma tenacifolium Corner 1994
Tricholoma tenue P.W.Graff 1914
 Tricholoma terreum (Schaeff.) P.Kumm. 1871
Tricholoma testaceum G.Stev. 1964 – New Zealand
Tricholoma thalliophilum Rob.Henry 1956
Tricholoma tigrinum (Schaeff.) Gillet 1874
Tricholoma transmutans (Peck) Sacc., 1887
Tricholoma tridentinum Singer 1943
Tricholoma triste (Scop.) Quél. 1872
Tricholoma tristiforme Kauffman 1921
Tricholoma tucumanense Speg. 1919
Tricholoma tumidum (Pers.) Ricken 1915
Tricholoma turbinipes (Kalchbr.) McAlpine 1895

U 
Tricholoma uliginosum Velen. 1920 – Europe
Tricholoma ulvinenii Kalamees 2001
Tricholoma umbonatum Clémençon & Bon 1985
Tricholoma umbraticum Corner 1994
Tricholoma unifactum Peck 1906
Tricholoma urbicum Ferrarese & Zaffalon 2008
Tricholoma uropus Corner 1994
 Tricholoma ustale (Fr.) P.Kumm. 1871
 Tricholoma ustaloides Romagn. 1954

V 

Tricholoma vaccinoides Pilát 1971
Tricholoma vaccinum (Schaeff.) P.Kumm. 1871
Tricholoma vacini Velen. 1939 – Europe
Tricholoma venenatum G.F. Atk., 1908
Tricholoma vernale Velen. 1920 – Europe
Tricholoma vernaticum Shanks 1996 – United States
Tricholoma versicolor Velen. 1920 – Europe
Tricholoma vestipes Velen. 1920 – Europe
Tricholoma villosiparvum Corner 1994
Tricholoma vinaceogriseum P.D.Orton 1987
Tricholoma violaceibrunneum Corner 1994
Tricholoma virgatum (Fr.) P.Kumm. 1871
Tricholoma viridifucatum Bon 1976 – Europe
Tricholoma viridilutescens M.M.Moser 1978
Tricholoma viridiolivaceum G.Stev. 1964 – New Zealand

W 
Tricholoma weizianum Reichert & Aviz.-Hersh. 1959

Z 
Tricholoma zangii Z.M.Cao, Y.J.Yao & Pegler 2003 – China
Tricholoma zelleri (D.E.Stuntz & A.H.Sm.) Ovrebo & Tylutki 1975
Tricholoma zonatum Velen. 1939 – Europe
Tricholoma zvarae Velen. 1922

References

General references

Tricholoma